LaRue Burley (born April 25, 1984) is an American mixed martial artist currently competing in the Welterweight division of the XFC. A professional competitor since 2012, he has also fought in WSOF, Bellator MMA, King of the Cage and the RFA.

Mixed martial arts career

Amateur career
Burley began his amateur MMA career in 2012, compiling a record of 2-0.

Bellator MMA
After going 2–0 in smaller promotions, Burley made his Bellator debut against Bubba Jenkins on September 20, 2013 at Bellator 100. Despite being a heavy underdog, Burley won the fight via technical knockout in the third round.

In his next Bellator appearance, Burley faced Cliff Wright at Bellator 117 on April 18, 2014. He won the fight via unanimous decision.

Burley faced Raymond Pina at Bellator 126 on September 26, 2014. He won the fight via submission in the second round.

Resurrection Fighting Alliance
Burley signed with the Resurrection Fighting Alliance and made his promotional debut against T.J. Hepburn on April 10, 2015 at RFA 25: Lawrence vs. Toomer. He won the fight via guillotine choke submission in the first round.

World Series of Fighting
In June 2015, Burley signed an exclusive, multi-fight contract with the World Series of Fighting.  In his debut, he faced |Brian Foster at WSOF 23 on September 18, 2015.  He lost the fight via knockout in the first round.

In his second fight for the promotion, Burley faced Ramil Mustapayev at WSOF 25 on November 20, 2015.  He lost the fight via unanimous decision.

Personal life
Burley has three sons and one daughter.

Mixed martial arts record

|-
|Win
|align=center|11–4
|Bradley Desir
|TKO (punches)
|XFC 44
|
|align=center|3
|align=center|3:14
|Des Moines, Iowa, United States
|
|- 
|Win
|align=center|10–4
|Alejandro Sanchez
|Submission (guillotine choke)
|XFC 43
|
|align=center|3
|align=center|4:21
|Atlanta, Georgia, United States
|
|- 
|Win
|align=center|9–4
|Manny Villareal
|Decision (unanimous)
|LFA 53
|
|align=center|3
|align=center|5:00
|Phoenix, Arizona, United States
|Catchweight (165 lbs) bout.
|- 
|Loss
|align=center|8–4
|Rafa García
|KO (punches)
|Combate 24: Alday vs. Lopez
|
|align=center|1
|align=center|2:26
|Phoenix, Arizona, United States
|
|-
|Win
|align=center|8–3
|Maycon Mendonça
|Decision (unanimous)
|LFA 24
|
|align=center|3
|align=center|5:00
|Phoenix, Arizona, United States
| 
|-
| Loss
|align=center|7–3
|James Nakashima
|Decision (unanimous)
|LFA 11
|
|align=center|3
|align=center|5:00
|Phoenix, Arizona, United States
| 
|-
| Win
|align=center|7–2
|Cedric Marks
|TKO (punches)
|Fists of Fury 11
|
|align=center|3
|align=center|1:00
|Woodward, Oklahoma, United States
| 
|-
| Loss
|align=center|6–2
|Ramil Mustapayev
|Decision (unanimous)
|WSOF 25
|
|align=center|3
|align=center|5:00
|Phoenix, Arizona, United States
| 
|-
| Loss
|align=center|6–1
|Brian Foster
|KO (punch)
|WSOF 23
|
|align=center|1
|align=center|0:32
|Phoenix, Arizona, United States
| 
|-
|Win
|align=center|6–0
|T.J. Hepburn
|Submission (guillotine choke)
|RFA 25: Lawrence vs. Toomer
|
|align=center|1
|align=center|3:49
|Sioux Falls, South Dakota, United States
|
|-
|Win
|align=center|5–0
|Raymond Pina
|Submission (guillotine choke)
|Bellator 126
|
|align=center|2
|align=center|0:22
|Phoenix, Arizona, United States
|
|-
|Win
|align=center|4–0
|Cliff Wright
|Decision (unanimous)
|Bellator 117
|
|align=center|3
|align=center|5:00
|Council Bluffs, Iowa, United States
|
|-
|Win
|align=center|3–0
|Bubba Jenkins
|TKO (punches)
|Bellator 100
|
|align=center|3
|align=center|3:40
|Phoenix, Arizona, United States
|
|-
|Win
|align=center|2–0
|Gabe Rivas
|TKO (punches)
|KOTC: Regulators
|
|align=center|1
|align=center|1:06
|Scottsdale, Arizona, United States
|
|-
|Win
|align=center|1–0
|Kelley Oser
|Decision (unanimous)
|Coalition of Combat: Pound for Pound
|
|align=center|3
|align=center|5:00
|Phoenix, Arizona, United States
|

References

Living people
1984 births
American male mixed martial artists
Lightweight mixed martial artists